, better known by the stage name , was a Japanese voice actor born in Fukushima Prefecture, Japan. He died in 1998 from Typhoid. After his death, his ongoing roles were replaced with other voice actors.

Filmography

Television animation
Akū Daisakusen Srungle (Crime Boss)
Attacker YOU! (Director Matsugorō Daimon)
Blue Comet SPT Layzner (Gasten)
The Brave Fighter of Legend Da-Garn (Cyan)
The Brave Fighter of Sun Fighbird (Detective Satsuta)
The Brave of Gold Goldran (Treasure Walzac)
Brave Police J-Decker (Dr. Eric Von Gigastein III)
Chōdendō Robo Tetsujin 28-go FX (President Zorn)
Detective Conan (Hideo Kawashima, Toshiro Ebara)
Flame of Recca (Sekiou)
Hariken Polymer (Flying Squirrels member)
Lupin III Part 2 (Goemon Ishikawa I)
Machine Robo: Revenge of Cronos (Gadess)
Mahōjin Guru Guru (Demon Giri)
Mashin Hero Wataru (Schwarzervinegar, Zan Gyakku)
Miru to Kowaku Naru Tsūkai! Yokozuna Anime Aa Harimanada (Mitsugu Tachikaze)
Mobile Fighter G Gundam (Dahāru Muhamando, Mākirotto Chronos)
Nintama Rantarō (Fūki, Panzō Kurokoge)
Obocchama-kun (Subaruta-sensei)
Ronin Warriors (Arago)
Round Vernian Vifam (Professor Melvin Krake)
Space Runaway Ideon (Professor Formosa)
Uchū Majin Daikengō (Gōriki)
Zenki (Gōra)
Zettai Muteki Raijin-Oh (Emperor Warusar)

Original video animation (OVA)
Armored Trooper Votoms: Shining Heresy (Noscowitz)
Dragon Slayer: The Legend of Heroes (Akudamu)
Giant Robo: The Animation (Li Zhong, Professor Duncan)
La Blue Girl (Bosatsu and Ranmaru's Grandfather)
Violence Jack (Slum King)
Ys II: Ancient Ys Vanished - The Final Chapter (Dalles)

Video games
Langrisser: The Descendants of Light (Chaos)
Panzer Bandit (Farado)

Tokusatsu
B-Fighter Kabuto (Dark Beast Tokasuzura)

Dubbing

Live-action
Hard Target (1997 Fuji TV edition) (Mr. Lopacki (Robert Apisa))
Indiana Jones and the Last Crusade (Sallah (John Rhys-Davies))
Space Rangers (Zylyn (Cary-Hiroyuki Tagawa))
Spenser: For Hire (Hawk (Avery Brooks))

Animation
TaleSpin (Don Karnage (Jim Cummings)
Teenage Mutant Ninja Turtles (Bebop)

Successors
Ryuzaburo Otomo: (Super Robot Wars: Geddes, Ganan, Emperor Warusa; Nintama Rantaro: Kazeoni black moss)
Hiroshi Naka: (Anpanman :Spade Musketeers)
Banjou Ginga: (Sunrise Eiyuutan: Emperor)
Daisuke Gouri: (Sunrise Eiyuutan: Ganan)
Kazuhisa Tanaka: (Sabata: officer)
Jin Urayama: (Nintama Rantaro: Jokoji Azukae Gate Officer)
Kenji Nomura: (Nintama Rantaro: Jokoji Azukae Gate Officer)

References

External links
 Seiyū Database WWW Version
 

1948 births
1998 deaths
Japanese male voice actors
Male voice actors from Fukushima Prefecture
Deaths from typhoid fever